Halo-halo, also spelled haluhalo, Tagalog for "mixed" (the more common spelling instead literally equating to "mix-mix"), is a popular cold dessert in the Philippines made up of crushed ice, evaporated milk or coconut milk, and various ingredients including ube jam (ube halaya), sweetened kidney or garbanzo beans, coconut strips, sago, gulaman (agar), pinipig, boiled taro or soft yams in cubes, flan, slices or portions of fruit preserves and other root crop preserves. The dessert is topped with a scoop of ube ice cream. It is usually prepared in a tall clear glass and served with a long spoon. Halo-halo is considered to be the unofficial national dessert of the Philippines.

History
The origin of halo-halo is traced to the pre-war Japanese Filipinos and the Japanese kakigōri class of desserts. One of the earliest versions of halo-halo was a dessert known locally as monggo con hielo (derived from the Maíz con hielo Spanish Filipino dessert) or mongo-ya, which consisted of only mung beans (Tagalog: monggo or munggo, used in place of red azuki beans from Japan), boiled and cooked in syrup (minatamis na monggo), served on top of crushed ice with milk and sugar. Over time, more native ingredients were added, resulting in the creation and development of the modern halo-halo. One difference between halo-halo and its Japanese ancestor is the placement of ingredients mainly under the ice instead of on top of it. The original monggo kon-yelo type can still be found today, with similar variations using sweet corn (mais kon-yelo) or saba bananas (saba kon-yelo).

Some authors specifically attribute halo-halo to the 1920s or 1930s Japanese migrants in the Quinta Market of Quiapo, Manila, due to its proximity to the Insular Ice Plant, Quiapo's main ice supply. The Insular Ice Plant was built in 1902 by the Americans, which became the ice supplier for the Philippines. Although the ice plant was built, it was not the first introduction of ice in the Philippines. In the mid-19th century, the United States imported ice from Wenham Lake to different countries, including India, Australia, and the Philippines.

The spelling of "halo-halo" is considered incorrect by the Commission on the Filipino Language, which prescribes "haluhalo." The word is an adjective meaning "mixed [together]" in Tagalog, a reduplication of the Tagalog verb halo "to mix."

Description

There is no correct set of ingredients for halo-halo as the ingredients can vary widely, but the dessert usually includes sugar palm fruit (kaong), coconut sport (macapuno), saba plantains cooked in syrup (minatamis na saging), jackfruit (langkâ), agar jellies (gulaman), tapioca pearls, nata de coco, sweet potato (kamote), sweetened beans, cheese, pounded toasted young rice (pinipig), and ice cream. The ingredients are placed in specific positions; the fruit, beans, and other sweets are placed at the bottom, followed by shaved ice, and are then topped with either a combination of leche flan, ube halaya (mashed purple yam), or ice cream. Evaporated milk or coconut milk is poured into the mixture upon serving. There are various local and regional varieties of Halo-halo that can be found throughout the country, which include different and/or additional ingredients than those previously listed, including sweetened wintermelon, durian, and strawberry ice cream, among others.

A similar Visayan dessert binignit, commonly called bilo-bilo, is also referred to as "ginataang halo-halo" in Tagalog ("halo-halo in coconut milk"), commonly shortened to "ginataan." It is mostly the same ingredients, although the latter is usually served hot.

In popular culture
Halo-halo was featured in season 1, episode 2 of Anthony Bourdain: Parts Unknown when its host Anthony Bourdain visited a Jollibee branch, a Filipino fast-food restaurant, in Los Angeles. Bourdain praised the dessert and called it "oddly beautiful". He also posted a photo of the dessert on his Twitter account. The show featured the dessert again in season 7, episode 1 when Bourdain learns how Filipinos make the dessert.

Halo-halo was also featured as a Quickfire Challenge dish season 4, episode 7 of the American reality television series Top Chef. American contestant Dale Talde prepared the dessert, which featured avocado, mango, kiwifruit, and nuts. Talde was named one of the top three Quickfire Challenge dishes by guest judge Johnny Iuzzinni of Jean Georges. Talde also made the dish in a later episode.

The dessert was featured on a Delicious Destinations edition episode of Bizarre Foods.

Halo-halo has a wide range of where it can be found, from food stands to 5-star hotels. Filipino fast-food restaurants like Jollibee, Max's, and Chowking serve halo-halo.

See also

 Ais Kacang (ABC): Malaysian shaved ice
 Bingsu: Korean shaved ice
 Chè: Vietnamese sweet beverage
 Es campur and Es teler: Indonesian shaved ice
 Falooda: Indian cold dessert
 Grattachecca: Italian shaved ice popular in Rome.
 Hawaiian shave ice: Hawaiian shaved ice
 Kakigōri: Japanese shaved ice
 Namkhaeng sai and O-aew: Thai shaved ice
 Tshuah-ping: Taiwanese shaved ice

Other Filipino cold desserts:

 Ice buko
 Iskrambol
 Mais kon-yelo
 Saba kon-yelo

References

Further reading

External links

 Halo-halo—from the Philippine Inquirer Internet Edition
 Halo-Halo: Business & Recipe for Success—Pinoy Bisnes Ideas

Foods containing coconut
Ice-based desserts
Japanese cuisine
Philippine desserts
Palauan desserts
Tagalog words and phrases